Balnain is a small village in Glenurquhart, Scotland, about 5 miles west of Drumnadrochit. It is mostly dependent on tourism, forestry, agriculture and farming. The first buildings were created in the 1870s and 1880s and minor expansions occurred in the 1900s, 1960s and 1970. Its height above sea level is 123.6m.

Overview
The River Enrick runs past the village and through to Loch Meiklie. The village also has a primary school.

Balnain is a small village 5 miles north of Glenurquhart, Scotland. The River Enrick runs past the village and through to Loch Meiklie. The local guest house was called Meiklie House, but is now Glenurquhart House.

History

Balmacaan Estate
Much of Glenurquhart was part of the Balmacaan Estate (AKA: The Glen Urquhart Estate), owned by the Grant family of Seafield between 1509 and 1946. The estate It was rented to the wealthy American industrialist and local benefactor Bradley Martin late 19th and early 20th century  and flourished in the 1880s and 1890s, but went into decline after the 1920s. The estate then changed hands frequently enough that the issue was raised in parliament  The best forestry wood had been felled during World War 2 and the estate was dissolved in 1946. Balmacaan House, near Drumnadrochit, was abandoned soon afterwards set on fire by vandals in the 1960s and demolished in 1972.

In 1946 Bunloit Farm was separated from Balmacaan Estate and Bunloit Estate was formed around it. near the  small settlement of Balbeg, located on the north west shore of Loch Ness, about 4 miles south of Drumnadrochit.

Origins
The people were originally from Balnain\Rogie near Castle Leod, 27 miles north of Loch Meiklie, in today's Torrachilty forest.

It was first mentioned in a 1610 charter as the: '"fishings in the Linn of Coul, called Rogie" (NAS GD1/1149/4) 

In 1681 it was in the possession of Alexander Mackenzie of Coul in 1681.

A historic quote from the mid 18th century reads:“Our first observation has to be that when the sheep farm at Rogie came into being there was a massive clearance of people from the old township of Balnain.” 

The last resident, William Macrae, appeared for the last time in the 1947/1948 Valuation Rolls.

Its ruins are now referred to as Rogie or Rogg and are a listed archeological site.

The village
Much of Glenurquhart, was part of the Balmacaan Estate owned by the Grant family of Seafield between 1509 and 1946
 The estate forished in the 1880s and 1890s, but went in to decline after the 1920s. The best wood had been felled during World War 2 and the estate was desolved in 1946. Balmacaan House, near Drumnadrochit, was abandoned soon afterwards, set on fire by vandals in the 1960s and demolished in 1972.

Glenurquhart used to be part of the lands of the Grants of Glenmorison, with the lands of the Frasers to the north for most of its time. The Fraser family of Balnain, Scotland, supported Bonnie Prince Charlie., but came from a township of the same name, in Stratherrick on the other side of Loch Ness.

It was called Lochlater the mid 1700s, after Loch Meiklie's old name of Loch Later.

Balnain had yet to exist by 1832, other than just the near by house of Lakefield and Lochlater had also ceased to be by that date. Loch Meiklie was also known as Loch Loitter at this time  and possibly the nomenclatural origin of the near by settlement of Lochletter, Lochletter House and Lochletter forest. The River Enrick was known as Endrie Water at this time.

Several buildings were erected during 1872, appearing on some maps, but not others. 

Hazlebrea House, Lochletter House, 9 Balnain houses, a barn and the smithy were there in 1878 and 1896.

The primary school is of a Victorian origin and appeared in 1898 as an ordinary building, but became a school by 1908. 

Sraid-Na-Fiffin Street was built in the mid 1970s.

Climate
Like most of the United Kingdom, the Inverness area has an oceanic climate (Köppen: Cfb'').

The weather in the village is generally warm and sunny in the spring and summer, cool and fairly rainy in the autumn, and very cold and snowy with some blizzards in the winter.

Local amenities

Recreational areas and parks
Balnain-park is a play park.

Public house
The nearby pub is called "The Steading".

Post office
It closed circa 1998, when the owner retired.

Balnain bike park
The Forestry Commission's adventure bike park was opened in early 2009 and was closed in May 2011.

Primary school

It is a non-denominational, mixed sex school, with 37 pupils in 2012, but this was reduced to 35 pupils in as of 2013.

The main school building was built in circa 1880. The school did well in its 2006 and 2008 Ofsted reports. The leaky roof was fixed in 2008 after an Ofsted report commented on it 2 years earlier.

A defibrillator was installed in the school in 2017.

The headmistress was Mrs. M. L. Livingstone in 2010 and 2011. Ms. Stephanie Wood took over by In 2015, Miss Janis MacRae became Head but was shortly delayed after she broke her ankle.

Julie MacLeod became head teacher by 2021.

The School's opening hours in 2010 and now 2011 were 09.00 to 15.00 on week days in 2010 and 2011 Monday to Thursday 08.50 to 15.10 Friday 08.50 to 12.25. in 2021

There are regular after-school activities for between the ages of 5 to 12 in 2012.

The age bracket was 4 to 12 up to 2012. The top age was cut from 12 to 11 during 2012.  The schools age bracket was redefined as 3 to 12 years old by 2021.

Balnain Primary School's Folk Group won the Inverness Mod in 2018. 

The school uniform is a red Balnain School sweatshirt, with either grey trousers, pinafores or skirts and white or red polo shirt, or a white shirt.

A red hoody and fleece since has also been issued since 2017 

The Hockey\shinty kit was a navy blue and white T-shirt (unisex), jumper (girls), shorts (unisex) and black leggings (girls) 2017-2020.

Transport
There was an occasional weekday bus service to Inverness (as of 1990–2005), which is now only twice daily. The bus stop is on the junction between the A831 and School Road End. Road transport is often disrupted by harsh winter weather during December and January.

Nearby satellite settlements
Several small near-by settlements include: Strathnacro, Balnaglack, Balbeg, Uppertown, Balnalurigan and Lochletter Cottages.

Local attractions
The Forestry Commission closed the 2-year-old Bike-park and general access to cross-country cyclists in 2011, but walkers can still enjoy the scenery.

The annual Snowman Car Rally has passed through it since 1998.

Political representation
It has been part of following Westminster constituencies:
Inverness-shire (UK Parliament constituency) 1708-1918
Inverness (UK Parliament constituency) 1918-1983
Ross, Cromarty and Skye (UK Parliament constituency) 1983-1997
Ross, Skye and Inverness West (UK Parliament constituency) 1997-2005
Inverness, Nairn, Badenoch and Strathspey (UK Parliament constituency) 2005-to date

Gallery

See also
Inverness
Charles Kennedy MP
Simon Fraser of Balnain
Balbeg
Corrimony
Altnaharra

References

External links
Tripadvisor.co.uk
Balnain.2day.ws
Geo.ed.ac.uk
Scotlandbandbs.co.uk
Hmie.gov.uk
History of Parliament
Forestry and Land. Balnain
Populated places in Inverness committee area